The Western Metropolitan Area University Association (首都圏西部大学単位互換協定会) is a Japanese association for higher education, with members located primarily in western part of Tokyo Metropolitan Area. The current leading institute is Kokushikan University.  Students at the member schools can cross-register for credits toward their own school's degrees without any additional fees.  The association has created a substantial number of research and educational collaborations, including e-learning training program.

Membership
Azabu University
Kokushikan University
Sagami Women's University
Kitasato University
Joshibi University of Art and Design
Obirin University
Tamagawa University
Tokyo Jogakkan College
Kanagawa Institute of Technology
Shoin University
Tokyo University of Agriculture
Showa University of Music
Tokyo Polytechnic University
Sanno University
Den-en Chofu University
Kokugakuin University
Toyo Eiwa University
Kamakura Women's University
Takachiho University
Shohoku College
Izumi Junior College
Yokohama College of Art and Design
Yamazaki College of Animal Health Technology
Tokyo Jogakkan College
Yamano College of Aesthetics

References

External links
 Official website 

 
Private universities and colleges in Japan